Wilkie Osgood Moody (May 12, 1897 in Irabo, Congo Free State - February 22, 1976) was an American football player in the American Professional Football Association. The son of missionary parents, he is distinguished as being the first African-born player to play in the league that became the National Football League. He served in the US Army in World War I.

He played wingback for the Columbus Panhandles.

References

Columbus Panhandles players
Dayton Triangles players
Columbus Tigers players
United States Army personnel of World War I
American expatriates in the Congo Free State
1897 births
1976 deaths